Jean Milton Berdan (May 19, 1916 – November 16, 2004) was an American geologist.

Biography 
Berdan was born in 1916. After receiving a bachelors degree from Vassar College, she received a Ph.D. from Yale University in 1949. She joined the United States Geological Survey Water Resource Division in 1942. On the year she graduated from Yale, she got a career in the Paleontology and Stratigraphy Branch of the USGS. She made ostracodes and stratigraphy for Ordovician, Silurian, and Devonian periods. She wrote plenty of papers on them, including, USGS Examinations and Reports, filings, notes, and photographs. She died in 2004.

References 

20th-century American geologists
1916 births
2004 deaths
Yale Graduate School of Arts and Sciences alumni
20th-century American women scientists